Christian Convery is a Canadian actor. He plays the role of Gus in the Netflix fantasy series Sweet Tooth.

Life and career 
Convery made his film debut in the romantic comedy Hearts of Spring by Marita Grabiak as Conner, released in April 2016., followed by roles that year in Supernatural and Van Helsing, and then Legion and Lucifer in 2017. In November 2016 he was seen in the TV film My Christmas Dream by Hallmark Entertainment in his first leading role alongside Danica McKellar and David Haydn-Jones as the latter's son Cooper Stone. He is the cousin of actor Christopher Convery. 

In 2019, he was honored again with a Young Artist Award in the Streaming Series or Film category. In the 2018 drama film, Beautiful Boy with Timothée Chalamet and Steve Carell, he played the role of Jasper Sheff. He had a leading role as Morgan in the Disney Channel series Pup Academy.  He was also seen in the 2019 television film Descendants 3. Convery appeared as Will in Playing with Fire alongside John Cena, John Leguizamo, Judy Greer and Keegan-Michael Key. In 2020, he won the Best Lead Actor award in the Television Series for Pup Academy.

In the Netflix fantasy series Sweet Tooth with Will Forte and Nonso Anozie, he had a leading role as deer-man-boy Gus in 2021. For the drama The Tiger Rising, based on the book by Kate DiCamillo he stood with Dennis Quaid and Queen Latifah as Rob Horton on camera.

Filmography

References

External links
 

21st-century Canadian male actors
Canadian male child actors
Canadian male film actors
Canadian male television actors
Canadian male voice actors
Living people
Place of birth missing (living people)
Year of birth missing (living people)